William Edward Kibblewhite (6 October 1909 – 5 February 1951) was a Canadian long-distance runner. He competed in the men's 5000 metres at the 1928 Summer Olympics.

References

1909 births
1951 deaths
Athletes (track and field) at the 1928 Summer Olympics
Canadian male long-distance runners
Olympic track and field athletes of Canada
Athletes from Calgary